Yambo is a computer software package for studying many-body theory aspects of solids and molecule systems.
It calculates the excited state properties of physical systems from first principles, e.g., from quantum mechanics law without the use of empirical data. It is an open-source software released under the GNU General Public License (GPL). However the main development repository is private and only a subset of the features available in the private repository are cloned into the public repository and thus distributed.

Excited state properties
Yambo can calculate:

Quasiparticle energies: plasmon pole, COHSEX approximation, or real-axis
Lifetimes within the GW approximation
Optical absorption: RPA, Bethe Salpeter with or without Tamm-Dancoff approximation, TDDFT in TD-LDA or LRC
Electron energy loss spectroscopy
Dynamical polarizability

electron-phonon coupling (static and dynamic perturbation theory)
magneto optical properties
surface spectroscopy

Physical systems

Yambo can treat molecules and periodic systems (both metallic an insulating) in three dimensions (crystalline solids) 
two dimensions (surfaces) and one dimension (e.g., nanotubes, nanowires, polymer chains). It can also handle collinear (i.e., spin-polarized wave functions) and non-collinear (spinors) magnetic systems.

Typical systems are of the size of 10-100 atoms, or 10-400 electrons, per unit cell in the case of periodic systems.

Theoretical methods and approximations
Yambo relies on many-body perturbation theory and time-dependent density functional theory. Quasiparticle energies are calculated within the GW approximation for the self energy. Optical properties are calculated either by solving the  Bethe–Salpeter equation or by using the adiabatic local density approximation within time-dependent density functional theory.

Numerical details
Yambo uses a plane waves basis set to represent the electronic (single-particle) wavefunctions. Core electrons are described with norm-conserving pseudopotentials.
The choice of a plane-wave basis set enforces the periodicity of the systems. Isolated systems, and systems that are periodic in only one or two directions can be treated by using a supercell approach.
For such systems Yambo offers two numerical techniques for the treatment of the Coulomb integrals: the cut-off  and the random-integration method.

Technical details
Yambo is interfaced with plane-wave density-functional codes: ABINIT, PWscf, CPMD and with the ETSF-io library. The utilities that  interface these codes with Yambo are distributed along with the main program.
The source code is written in Fortran 95 and C
The code is parallelized using MPI running libraries

User interface
Yambo has a command line user interface. Invoking the program with specific option generates the input with default values for the parameters consistent with the present data on the system.
A postprocessing tool, distributed along with the main program, helps with the analysis and visualization of the results.

System requirements, portability
Unix based systems
Compilers for the programming languages Fortran 95 and C 
optional: PGI Fortran compiler for GPU version (starting from 4.5 release)
optional: netcdf, fftw, mpi (for parallel execution), etsf-io, libxc, hdf5
Hardware requirements depend very much on the physical system under study and the chosen level of theory. For random-access memory (RAM) the requirements may vary from less than 1 GB to few GBs, depending on the problem.

Learning Yambo
The Yambo team provides a wiki web-page with a list of tutorials and lecture notes.
On the yambo web-site there is also a list of all thesis done with the code.

Non-distributed part
Part of the YAMBO code is kept under a private repository.
These are the features implemented and not yet distributed:

total energy using adiabatic-connection fluctuation-dissipation theorem 
magnetic field
self-consistent GW
dynamical Bethe–Salpeter
finite-momentum Bethe-Salpeter
real-time spectroscopy
advanced kernels for time-dependent density functional theory (Nanoquanta kernel).

References

External links 
 
 

Physics software
Computational chemistry software
Free physics software